This is a list of hurlers who have received a runners-up medal for playing on a losing team in the final of the All-Ireland Senior Hurling Championship.

The list only includes hurlers who won a medal on the field of play in the final.

Runners-up medals
All-Ireland Senior Hurling Championship winners